Bangrove Wood is an  biological Site of Special Scientific Interest north of Ixworth in Suffolk, England.

This is ancient coppice with standards on clay soil with diverse herb flora. The most common trees are ash, field maple and hazel, with many oak standards. Flora include early purple orchid, wood anemone and pale wood violet.

The site is private land with no public access.

References

Sites of Special Scientific Interest in Suffolk
Ixworth